Tina Lynn Seelig (born 1957) is an American educator, entrepreneur, and author of several books on creativity and innovation. She is a faculty member at Stanford University.

Biography 
In 1985, Seelig earned her PhD in neuroscience from Stanford University School of Medicine.

After completing her PhD, Seelig worked as a management consultant for Booz, Allen and Hamilton and as a multimedia producer at Compaq Computer Corporation, and founded a multimedia company called BookBrowser.

In 1999, Seelig joined Stanford University. She is currently Professor of the Practice in Stanford's Department of Management Science and Engineering, as well as a faculty director of the Stanford Technology Ventures Program (STVP). She teaches courses in the Hasso Plattner Institute of Design (d.school) and leads three fellowship programs in the School of Engineering that are focused on creativity, innovation, and entrepreneurship.

Seelig is the author of 17 books, including:

 What I Wish I Knew When I Was 20 (2009), which Publisher' Weekly said "presents a thoughtful, concise set of observations for those making the unsteady transition to adulthood";
 inGenius (2012), which Entrepreneur called "the book for head honchos who are looking to shake up corporate stagnation"; and
 Insight Out (2016), which Entrepreneur recommended for "businesses who are looking for a way to release all of the creativity they feel is locked up in their human capital."

Honors and awards 
Seelig is the recipient of the National Olympus Innovation Award (2008), the Gordon Prize from the National Academy of Engineering (2009), and the Silicon Valley Visionary Award (2014).

Selected publications 
 Seelig, Tina. What I Wish I Knew When I Was 20: A Crash Course for Making Your Place in the World. HarperCollins, 2009. 
 Seelig, Tina. inGenius: A Crash Course on Creativity. HarperCollins, 2012. 
 Seelig, Tina. Insight Out: Get Ideas Out of Your Head and into the World. HarperCollins, 2016.

References 

1958 births
Living people
Stanford University faculty
21st-century American women writers
Stanford University School of Medicine alumni
Booz Allen Hamilton people
Compaq